836 (eight hundred [and] thirty-six) is the natural number following 835 and preceding 837.

In mathematics
They sum to 844. As this is greater than 836, it is an abundant number, but no subset sums to 836, so it is not a semiperfect number; therefore it is a weird number. Besides, 836 is the smallest weird number that is also an untouchable number, i.e. there is no n such that the sum of proper factors of n equals 836. (The only smaller weird number 70 is not untouchable, since σ(134) − 134 = 70)

See also
 836 (year)
 836 Jole (asteroid)
 836th Air Division, an inactive United States Air Force organization
 836 Naval Air Squadron, a World War II organization in the British Navy
 Pi Arietis, designated as object 836 in the Bright Star catalogue

References

Integers